We Were Young may refer to:

 We Were Young (film), a 1961 Bulgarian film originally released as A byahme mladi
We Were Young (album), a 2009 album by Jonathan Jones
"We Were Young" (song), a 2019 song by Petit Biscuit
 "We Were Young", a song by Charlotte Church from Back to Scratch

See also 

 We Are Young (disambiguation)